Jostein Maurstad Gundersen (born 4 April 1996) is a Norwegian footballer who plays as a defender for Tromsø in the Tippeligaen.

Career statistics

References

External links

1996 births
Living people
Norwegian footballers
Tromsø IL players
Eliteserien players
Norwegian First Division players
Association football defenders
Footballers from Bergen